The 1972 NCAA Men's Water Polo Championship was the fourth annual NCAA Men's Water Polo Championship to determine the national champion of NCAA men's college water polo. Tournament matches were played at the Armond H. Seidler Natatorium in Albuquerque, New Mexico during December 1972.

UCLA defeated UC Irvine in the final, 10–5, to win their third, and second consecutive, national title.

The leading scorer for the tournament was Jim Kruse from UC Irvine (31 goals). The Most Outstanding Player of the tournament was Eric Lindroth from UCLA. Additionally, an All-Tournament Team was named for the first time this year.

Qualification
Since there has only ever been one single national championship for water polo, all NCAA men's water polo programs (whether from Division I, Division II, or Division III) were eligible. A total of 8 teams were invited to contest this championship.

Bracket
Site: Armond H. Seidler Natatorium, Albuquerque, New Mexico

Championship Bracket

Consolation Bracket
Winner advanced to the Second Place Final against the loser of the Championship.

All-tournament teams

First team 
Eric Lindroth, UCLA (Most Outstanding Player)
Bruce Black, UC Irvine
Kevin Craig, UCLA
Jack Dickmann, UC Irvine
Brad Jackson, San José State
Jim Kruse, UC Irvine
Dennis Needleman, USC

Second team 
Garth Bergeson, UCLA
Curt Caldwell, USC
Greg Carey, UC Santa Barbara
Lucky Linder, USC
Scott Massey, UCLA
Ed Samuels, San José State
Steve Spencer, San José State

See also 
 NCAA Men's Water Polo Championship

References

NCAA Men's Water Polo Championship
NCAA Men's Water Polo Championship
December 1972 sports events in the United States
1972